Back to Work may refer to:
Back to Work: Why We Need Smart Government for a Strong Economy, 2011 book by former US President Bill Clinton
Back to Work Coalition, group of offshore oil and gas industry stakeholders and trade associations
Back to work legislation, a special law passed by Canada's federal or provincial governments that orders an end to strikes or lockouts and impose a settlement